is one of the eight wards of Niigata City, Niigata Prefecture, in the Hokuriku region of  Japan. , the ward had an estimated population of 136,224 in 60,830 households  and a population density of 3500 persons per km². After Chūō-ku, Higashi-ku is the second smallest ward in Niigata City, making up about 5% of the total land area. It ranks third for largest population, with about 17% of Niigata's residents living in the Higashi-ku.

Geography

The Shinano River is to the west. In the south is the Nihonkai-Tōhoku Expressway. The Agano River in the eastern part of the ward is on the border with neighboring Kita-ku. Most housing districts are located in the northern and southern parts of the ward, while the center consists mainly of business and manufacturing districts. Niigata Airport and Niigata Harbor are located in Higashi-ku.

Surrounding municipalities
Niigata Prefecture
Kita-ku, Niigata
Kōnan-ku, Niigata
Chūō-ku, Niigata

History
The area of present-day Higashi-ku was part of ancient Echigo Province. The town of Nuttari was established on April 1, 1889 within Kitakanbara District, Niigata with the establishment of the municipalities system. The city of Niigata annexed  in 1914, and Ogata and Ishiyama in 1943. Niigata became a government-designated city on April 1, 2007 and was divided into wards.

Education

University
 University of Niigata Prefecture

Primary and secondary schools
Higashi-ku has 12 public elementary schools and nine public middle schools operated by the city government. The ward has two public high schools operated by the Niigata Prefectural Board of Education. There is also one North Korean school, Niigata Elementary and Junior High School (新潟朝鮮初中級学校).

Transportation

Railway
 JR East - Shin'etsu Main Line

 JR East -  Hakushin Line
  -

Transit bus
 Transit bus operated by Niigata Kotsu
 C5
 S8 / S9
 E1 / E2 / E3 / E4 / E5 / E6 / E7 / E8

Highways
 Nihonkai-Tōhoku Expressway

Airport
 Niigata Airport

Local attractions

Places
 Yamanoshita Minato Tower

References

External links

 Niigata official website 
 Niigata Higashi-ku website 
 Niigata City Official Tourist Information (multilingual)
 Niigata Pref. Official Travel Guide (multilingual)

Wards of Niigata (city)